Chirk Bank is a small village in Shropshire, England.

The industrial town of Chirk is to the north, over the border in Wales, with the B5070 road connecting the two settlements via a bridge (Chirk Bridge) over the River Ceiriog. The larger village of Weston Rhyn is to the south-west and Chirk Bank is part of its civil parish. The hamlet of Gledrid is just outside Chirk Bank, near to the A5 road and on the border (the B5070) with the parish of St Martin's.

The Llangollen Canal passes by the village. There are three public houses in the vicinity: The Bridge, the Lord Moreton, and the Poachers Pocket.

References

Villages in Shropshire